Events of the year 2023 in Belarus.

Incumbents 

 President – Alexander Lukashenko
 Prime Minister – Roman Golovchenko

Events 
Ongoing: Belarusian involvement in Russian invasion of Ukraine

 7 February: A court in Minsk sentences Polish-Belarusian activist Andrzej Poczobut to eight years in prison for his criticism of president Alexander Lukashenko.
 26 February: Belarusian opposition partisans launch a drone attack on Russian aircraft at the Machulishchy air base.
 3 March: A court in Minsk, sentences human rights activist and 2022 Nobel Peace laureate Ales Bialiatski to 10 years in prison over "financing actions violating public order" and smuggling.
 6 March: A court in Belarus sentences five opposition politicians after a trial in absentia. Pavel Latushka was sentenced to 18 years, Sviatlana Tsikhanouskaya to 15 years, and Maryya Maroz, Volha Kavalkova and Siarhei Dylevski to 12 years.
 9 March: President Alexander Lukashenko signs a bill into law which allows the use of the death penalty on officials and military servicemen convicted of high treason.

Sports 

 2023 CIS Games
 2022–23 Belarusian Cup

References 

 
Belarus
Belarus
2020s in Belarus
Years of the 21st century in Belarus